Houari Ferhani (born February 11, 1993) is an Algerian footballer who plays for Algerian Ligue Professionnelle 1 side MC Alger.

Career
In October 2015, Ferhani was selected as part of the Algeria's under-23 national team for the 2015 U-23 Africa Cup of Nations in Senegal.

Ferhani got his first call up to the senior Algeria side for a 2018 FIFA World Cup qualifier against Cameroon in October 2016.

References

External links
 
 
 

1993 births
2015 Africa U-23 Cup of Nations players
Algeria under-23 international footballers
Algerian footballers
Algerian Ligue Professionnelle 1 players
Living people
People from Koléa
RC Arbaâ players
USM Alger players
JS Kabylie players
Footballers at the 2016 Summer Olympics
Olympic footballers of Algeria
Association football defenders
21st-century Algerian people
Algeria international footballers